Chandgiri is a village in the Nashik District, Maharashtra, India.

References

Villages in Nashik district